Hanyang Long-Distance Bus Station, is a transport hub and metro station on Line 3 of the Wuhan Metro. It entered revenue service on December 28, 2015. It is located in Caidian District.

Station layout

References

Wuhan Metro stations
Line 3, Wuhan Metro
Railway stations in China opened in 2015